The 2021 Instacart 500 was a NASCAR Cup Series race held on March 14, 2021, at Phoenix Raceway in Avondale, Arizona. Contested over 312 laps on the  oval, it was the fifth race of the 2021 NASCAR Cup Series season.

Report

Background

The motorsport track opened in 1964 and currently hosts two NASCAR race weekends annually. PIR has also hosted the IndyCar Series, CART, USAC and the Rolex Sports Car Series. The raceway is currently owned and operated by International Speedway Corporation.

Entry list
 (R) denotes rookie driver.
 (i) denotes driver who are ineligible for series driver points.

Qualifying
Brad Keselowski was awarded the pole for the race as determined by competition-based formula.

Starting Lineup

Race
Martin Truex Jr. won the race, driving a Toyota. It was his first Cup Series win since the race at Martinsville Speedway in June 2020. He finished 1.698 seconds ahead of Ford driver Joey Logano. It was Truex's 28th Cup Series win and his first at Phoenix.

Stage Results

Stage One
Laps: 75

Stage Two
Laps: 115

Final Stage Results

Stage Three
Laps: 122

Race statistics
 Lead changes: 22 among 9 different drivers
 Cautions/Laps: 7 for 45
 Red flags: 0
 Time of race: 3 hours, 0 minutes and 20 seconds
 Average speed:

Media

Television
Fox Sports covered their 16th race at the Phoenix Raceway. Mike Joy, two-time Phoenix winner Jeff Gordon and Clint Bowyer called the race from the broadcast booth. Jamie Little and Regan Smith handled pit road for the television side. Larry McReynolds provided insight from the Fox Sports studio in Charlotte.

Radio
MRN covered the radio action for the race which was also simulcasted on Sirius XM NASCAR Radio. Alex Hayden and Jeff Striegle called the race when the field raced past the start/finish line. Dan Hubbard called the action from turns 1 & 2 and Kyle Rickey called the action from turns 3 & 4. Pit lane was manned by Steve Post and Dillon Welch.

Standings after the race

Drivers' Championship standings

Manufacturers' Championship standings

Note: Only the first 16 positions are included for the driver standings.

References

2021 in sports in Arizona
2021 NASCAR Cup Series
March 2021 sports events in the United States
NASCAR races at Phoenix Raceway